Alcalá de Henares is a Spanish city in the Community of Madrid. , it has a population of 193,751, making it the region's third-most populated municipality.

Predated by earlier settlements (oppida) on the left bank of the Henares, the city has its origins in the Complutum settlement founded in Roman times on the right bank (north) of the river, that became a bishopric seat in the 5th century. One of the several Muslim citadels in the Middle Mark of al-Andalus (hence the name Alcalá, a derivative of the Arabic term for citadel) was established on the left bank, while, after the Christian conquest culminated circa 1118, the bulk of the urban nucleus returned to the right bank. For much of the late middle-ages and the early modern period before becoming part of the province of Madrid, Alcalá de Henares was a seigneurial estate of the archbishops of Toledo.

Its historical centre is one of UNESCO's World Heritage Sites.

The city has a long university tradition. Francisco Jiménez de Cisneros founded the Complutense University in Alcalá de Henares in the late 15th century. The city currently hosts the (refounded) University of Alcalá. It is the native city of Miguel de Cervantes.

Name 

Its Latin name, means "confluence",  
where rivers' water (or rain water) flow into one place (i.e., a ).

History

The city boundaries have been inhabited since the Chalcolithic phase of the Bronze Age. Romans conquered the area in the 1st century BC, and built the town of Complutum near a previous Carpetanian settlement, Iplacea. With 10,000 inhabitants, it reached the status of municipium and had its own governing institutions. It played an important role, located on the Roman road connecting Emerita Augusta and Caesaraugusta.

After the downfall of the Roman Empire, under the Visigoths, it declined, although it also became a pilgrimage destination in remembrance of the Saints Justo and Pastor.

On 3 May 1118, it was conquered by the Archbishop of Toledo Bernard de Sedirac at behest of Castile.

Soon after, on 10 February 1129, Alfonso VII gave Alcalá to Raymond de Sauvetât, also Archbishop of Toledo, becoming an archiepiscopal property for centuries to come. Raymond granted the town an old fuero (charter) in 1135.

The Christians preferred the Burgo de Santiuste ("Saint Just's borough") on the original Roman site, and the Muslim one was abandoned.

Under Christian rule until the end of the Reconquista, the town had both a Jewish and a Moorish quarter and a renowned marketplace. Its central position allowed it to be a frequent residence of the Kings of Castile, when travelling south.

At some time in the 1480s, Christopher Columbus first met there the Reyes Católicos, King Ferdinand II of Aragon and his wife Queen Isabella I of Castile, who financed the travel for the Discovery of America.

Cardinal Cisneros granted the town a new fuero in 1509.

Despite being largely ruined, the town acquired the status of city in 1687 after long negotiations.

In decadence since the mid-18th century, Alcalá de Henares experienced a relative demographic and economic upturn in the second half of the 19th century, based on its newly acquired condition of military outpost, to which an embryonic industrial nucleus was also added.

The population steadily increased from 1868 to 1939. The population was still agrarian to a large extent, with high levels of illiteracy and poverty. Seeking social change, Republican and later Socialist movements grew in force in the city. Emerging in reaction to Socialist advances, Social catholicism also took hold in the city from 1905, founding a number of organizations such as Centro Católico de Acción Social Popular and the Mutual Obrera Complutense.

Following the 1936 coup d'etat that sparked the Spanish Civil War, putschist elements seized key posts around the city. However, following the botched coup in Madrid, Rebel forces in Alcalá eventually surrendered to Republican Colonel Ildefonso Puigdendolas and his troops on 21 July. Alcalá, that reportedly became a Soviet power base during the conflict—a "republic within the republic" where the Republican national government held a tenuous grip—was the place were POUM leader Andrés Nin was transferred to and presumably tortured and killed in June 1937 by NKVD agents.

The city suffered severe damage during the Spanish Civil War.

Thousands of prisoners were held in different camps in the city after the end of the war. From March 1939 to February 1948, at least 264 individuals were executed in Alcalá by the Francoist authorities.

Ecclesiastical history

The town of historic importance was one of the first bishoprics founded in Spain.

The polyglot Bible known as the Complutensian Polyglot Bible, the first of the many similar Bibles produced during the revival of Biblical studies that took place in the 16th century, was printed at Alcalá under the care of Cardinal Cisneros.

A papal bull of 7 March 1885, united Alcalá with (effectively merging it into) the diocese of Madrid, which includes the civil province of Madrid, suffragan of the archbishopric of Toledo. The bishop's residence has since been used for preserving historical archives. It was designed by Alonso Berruguete and has a famous staircase.

Jewish history
During Muslim rule, the Jewish community of the city was granted equal rights as the Christians living in it. In the Middle Ages, the Jewish congregation of the city paid taxes to the Archbishop of Toledo. The Jews of Alcalá were mentioned in the 14th-century Satire by Marrano Pero Ferrús. During the 15th century, the Jewish congregation of the city was one of the largest in Castile, having about 200 Jewish families. Hebrew studies at the University of Alcalá were encouraged by Cardinal Francisco Jimenez de Cisneros during the 16th century, bringing some Jews and Marrano Hebraists to work in the city. The location of the Jewish quarter of the city is well known – between Mayor, Santiago, Imagen and Cervantes streets. One synagogue stood in Carmen Calzado street, no. 10. The other was on Santiago street. After the 1492 Alhambra Decree Jews were required to become Christians to continue living in Castile and Aragon; those who refused had to leave these kingdoms and most of them found residence in the North of Africa, Amsterdam and the Ottoman Empire.

The origins of Miguel de Cervantes' family are supposed (there is no total certainty) to be Jewish. Because his father worked on the former Jewish neighbourhood, the birthplace was close to the workplace, and also because the surname Cervantes makes reference to a different site in the Northwest of Spain, and geographical surnames were common among the Jewish population.

Geography

Location 

Alcalá de Henares is located in the central part of the Iberian Peninsula, in the southern half of the Inner Plateau. It lies on the valley of the Henares, a left-bank tributary of the Jarama, which is in turn a right-bank tributary of the Tagus. The right (north) bank of the river (on which the current urban nucleus was built) displays a very flat relief with a series of quaternary fluvial terraces, while the left (southern) bank features a very steep slope of clays from the miocene, rapidly rising up to the moors of La Alcarria.

Standing at an average altitude of 654 m, and occupying some 88 km2; the city was for a long time contained in between the Henares to the South and the Madrid-Barcelona railway to the North. However, the increasing population brought on the sprawl of the urbanised area to the area located in between the railway and the A-2 motorway and beyond.

Climate
The climate in this city of central Spain is semi-arid, with cold, dry winters and hot, dry summers. Dry season coincides with maximum heat in summer.

University

The major landmark and one of the great prides of the city, its university, uses sites throughout the city, but has two main campuses. The first is on the north side of Alcalá. This campus includes most science departments and student housing (as well as its own, separate Renfe station). The second, central campus, houses most of the humanities and social-science departments, including a law school.

The architectural influence of the university can be found in other present-day academic institutions. The University of San Diego is largely based on the Spanish university; its campus and address take the name "Alcalá Park".  In addition, some buildings at Texas Tech University in Lubbock, Texas were modeled after the architecture of Universidad de Alcalá de Henares.

In 1293 in Alcalá de Henares King Sancho IV of Castile founded the Universidad Complutense, one of the oldest universities in the world, as a Studium Generale. With the patronage of Cardinal Cisneros, it was recognized in a 1499 papal bull, and quickly gained international fame as a main centre of learning of the Renaissance thanks to the production of the Complutensian Polyglot Bible in 1517, which is the basis for most of the current translations. By royal decree, the university moved to Madrid in 1836 (initially as the Universidad de Madrid, later as the Universidad Central, which in the 1970s would finally be renamed Universidad Complutense de Madrid). A new university was founded in the old buildings as the Universidad de Alcalá in 1977. Parts of the new university occupy the buildings of the old Universidad Complutense in the city centre, including the modern Colegio de San Ildefonso, and other Colegios, and the structures have served as a model for other universities across the Spanish territories in the Americas and other dependencies.

The university chapel dedicated to Saint Ildefonso has a monument to the university's founder, Cardinal Cisneros, by Fancelli, an Italian sculptor.

Although the present university is named "Universidad de Alcalá", the ancient institution founded by Cisneros is the one now called "Universidad Complutense", translocated in the capital city of Madrid ("Complutensis" is the Latin word for "native of Alcalá"). The modern university is related to the original institution in name only, although it occupies the former buildings of the Complutense.

Cathedral

Constructed between 1497 and 1514, the cathedral houses the remains of Saints Justus and Pastor, two Christian schoolboys martyred near the city during the persecutions of the Roman Emperor Diocletian at the beginning of the 4th century.

In 414 a chapel was erected at the site of Justus and Pastor's martyrdom, and was converted into a cathedral during the period of Visigoth control of Hispania; bishops from Alcalá were present at the Councils of Toledo beginning in the 7th century. In 1053 the old city of Alcalá (Alcalá la Vieja) was conquered by  Ferdinand the Great, only to be recaptured the following year by the Moorish armies then warring for control of the Iberian Peninsula, who destroyed the cathedral as an act of retaliation. At that time the relics of Saints Justus and Pastor were taken to Huesca for safekeeping until after the reconquest of Alcalá in 1118. Although a church was rebuilt on the site in 1122, Pope Urban II, under the influence of his friend Raymond de Sauvetât, the Archbishop of Toledo, decided not to restore the Diocese of Alcalá at that time. Instead, de Sauvetât was able to secure the incorporation of Alcalá into his own archiepiscopal territories through a donation from King  Alfonso VII in 1129.

The church was rebuilt again some three hundred years later by a subsequent archbishop of Toledo, Alfonso Carrillo de Acuña, who elevated it to the status of a collegiate church. It was finally reconstructed in its present Isabelline Gothic style under Cardinal Cisneros (1495–1517), the founder of the university. A tower was added between 1528 and 1582, achieving its modern appearance in 1618. The processional cloister and the Chapel of Saint Peter were incorporated into the building in the 17th century.

The building was declared a national monument in 1904. Nevertheless, it was burned during the Spanish Civil War (1936–1939), and practically all of its contents were destroyed with the exception of a few minor relics and choir seats.

It was not until 1991 that the Diocese of Alcalá was finally restored, being separated from the Archdiocese of Madrid, at which time the building was granted its present status of cathedral-magistral. (Although the title "magistral" was originally granted by Cardinal Cisneros, the building was still technically only a collegiate church, and not yet a cathedral within the ecclesiastical meaning of the term.)

The Cathedral of Alcalá is notable as one of only two churches in the world to be granted the special title "magistral" (along with St. Peter's Church in Leuven, Belgium). The title reflects its former status as a collegiate church, and derives from the requirement that all of the canons of the cathedral must possess the academic distinction of Doctor of Theology in order to serve there.

In addition to that of Saints Justus and Pastor, the cathedral also houses the tomb of renowned 17th-century Spanish sculptor Gregorio Fernández.

Other buildings
The city is also home to the Archbishops Palace. This site is where Christopher Columbus and King Ferdinand planned the excursion to the West as well as the birthplace of Catherine of Aragon, daughter of Ferdinand and Isabella, who would be the first wife of King Henry VIII of England and therefore queen consort of England.

Alcalá's Corral of Comedies, which hosts a full program of theatre and is open for tours, is the oldest documented corral in the history of Spain.

The city today
The center of the city remains essentially medieval, with many winding cobbled streets, and many historic buildings. The city centre surrounds the Plaza de Cervantes and is traversed by a long pedestrian main street, the Calle Mayor.  The city includes the Moorish quarter, the Jewish quarter, and the Christian quarter.  These distinct neighborhoods have given Alcalá the reputation of "the city of three cultures."

The old city centre has been largely preserved, unlike the suburbs. There has been no clear planning by the city councillors regarding expansion, and the sprawling suburban areas are irregularly constructed, with the addition of 1970s-style high rise blocks in many places.

One of the most important streets in the city is the Calle del Cardenal Cisneros which takes tourists from the Madrid Gate at the entrance of the city, to the old city center and the cathedral in Santos Niños Square. The main park of Alcalá, Parque Municipal O'Donnell is a major recreational center for city residents and lies along a main road of Alcalá, Vía Complutense.

Recent archaeological excavations have opened up the city's Roman forum where a large complex comprising a basilica, public baths, a cryptoporticus, a market and a large monumental façade stands out. Alongside the forum is the Domus with an extraordinary collection of Roman domestic mural paintings. On the outskirts is the House of Hippolytus, an old school. In turn, the Regional Archaeology Museum (MAR) holds highly valuable mosaics.

The city hosts a large population of international students due to the presence of the university, and in particular its Spanish language and literature programs for foreign students.  Alcalingua, a branch of University of Alcalá, is one of the major foreign language learning centers for students from abroad.

The storks
Alcalá is well known for its population of white storks.  Their large nests can be observed atop many of the churches and historic buildings in the city, and are themselves a significant tourist attraction. Situated in the lowlands of the Henares river, the city is an attractive home for the migratory storks due to the wide availability of food and nesting material in the area.

For over twenty years, Alcalá's storks have been counted and studied, and the active protection and maintenance of their nests is by official policy. Although once in danger of disappearing, with only eleven pairs counted between 1986 and 1987, the population has grown to around 90 resident pairs today, many of which have shortened the distance and duration of their typical migrations to remain in the city nearly all year.

Immigration
Some 18% of the population are of foreign origin, according to the official data, a large part of the newcomers (30%) are immigrants from Eastern Europe. Many Chinese businesses have also been established in the city. Alcalá has the largest community (18%) of Romanian immigrants in Spain, with over 35,000 people. In 2007, for the first time, the immigrants from Romania created a political party for the elections to come.

Transport

Alcalá's excellent transport links with Madrid have led to its becoming a commuter town, with many of its inhabitants travelling to work in the capital. By Cercanias (railway) is the lines C2 and C7 that links Alcalá de Henares with Madrid in 35 minutes, or Guadalajara in 25 minutes, also exists in the peak hours trains called CIVIS, direct train, that makes the journey in 20 minutes. Also it is linked by bus to Madrid, Guadalajara and several towns and villages in nearby.
By car, Alcalá de Henares is well linked with the state roads network with the nearby A-2, the highway which starts in Madrid and continues on to Barcelona and to France.

Alcalá also has an intensive bus system called "Alcalá-Bus" which runs to all the major neighborhoods and costs 1,30 euro per ride.

Culture 
Cervantine city

Every year on 23 April, the anniversary of Cervantes' death, the city of Alcalá hosts the Miguel de Cervantes Prize, the Spanish-speaking world's most prestigious award for lifetime achievement in literature. The award is presented by the king of Spain at the University of Alcalá's historic . Speeches about the importance of the Spanish language are customarily given by the king, the minister of culture and the laureate. The ceremony attracts a wide range of dignitaries to the city including members of the royal family, the prime minister, and others.  During this ceremony the citizens of Alcalá can be heard singing the city's song, entitled "Alcalá de Henares."

Alcalá de Henares is a member (and promoter) of the Red de Ciudades Cervantinas (Network of Cervantine Cities).
Festivals
Alcalá hosts an annual "Noche en Blanco." During this festival the streets are filled with music, art, theatre, and dance as the city residents celebrate Alcalá's rich cultural heritage.  The festival goes well into the night and centers around the Plaza de Cervantes where stages are set up to host the performances.

International relations

Twin towns – sister cities
Alcalá de Henares has reached twin town and sister city agreements with:

 Talence, France (1985).
 Peterborough, United Kingdom (1986).
 Guanajuato, Mexico (1990).
 San Diego,  United States (1990).
 Fort Collins, United States (1995).
 , Cuba (1998).
 Lublin, Poland (2001).
 Alba Iulia, Romania (2005).
 Azul, Argentina (2011).

Saint Didacus, known as San Diego in Spanish, was born in Alcalá de Henares and is the namesake for the city of San Diego,  United States. Alcalá de Henares is the birthplace of Catherine of Aragon, is twinned with the English city of Peterborough in England, her final resting-place.

Notable people
Miguel de Cervantes (1547–1616). Spanish writer who is widely regarded as the greatest writer in the Spanish language and one of the world's pre-eminent novelists. His major work, Don Quixote, is considered the first modern novel, a classic of Western literature.
Juan Ruiz (1283–1350). Known as the Archpriest of Hita, was a medieval Castilian poet. He is best known for his ribald, earthy poem, "Libro de buen amor" (The Book of Good Love).
Catherine of Aragon (1485–1536). Catherine, the last surviving child of Queen Isabella I of Castile and King Ferdinand II of Aragon was born in the Archbishop's palace in Alcalá de Henares on December 16, 1485. She was Queen of England from June 1509 until May 1533 as the first wife of King Henry VIII
Ferdinand I, Holy Roman Emperor (1503–1564). Holy Roman Emperor from 1558, king of Bohemia and Hungary from 1526, and king of Croatia from 1527 until his death.
Manuel Azaña (1880–1940). Prime Minister and President of the Second Spanish Republic
Antonio Claudio Álvarez de Quiñones. (1670s–1736), Roman Catholic Archbishop of Bogotá
Pedro Obiang, professional footballer for Italian club U.S. Sassuolo Calcio
Roberto Sánchez (born 1989), Spanish footballer

See also

Complutenses, authors of the courses of Scholastic philosophy, theology and moral theology who were lecturers of the philosophical college of the Discalced Carmelites at Alcalá de Henares
Hermitage of San Isidro (Alcalá de Henares)

References
Citations

Bibliography

External links 

University and Historic Precinct of Alacalá de Henares UNESCO collection on Google Arts and Culture
 Madrid-Alcalá

 
Roman towns and cities in Spain
Roman sites in Spain
World Heritage Sites in Spain
1 BC establishments
Populated places established in the 1st century BC
Jewish Spanish history